Deuveia banghaasi is a moth in the family Epicopeiidae. It is found in central China.

The wingspan is 31–34 mm. Adults have been recorded on wing in June. It is a day-flying species.

Etymology
The genus is named for Dr. Thierry Deuve (MNHN).

References

Moths described in 1932
Epicopeiidae